The 2014 Euro Beach Soccer League (EBSL) is an annual European competition in beach soccer. The competitions allows national teams to compete in beach soccer in a league format over the summer months. Each season ends with a Superfinal, deciding the competition winner.

This season, there were twelve teams each participating in two divisions in each stage that faced each other in a round-robin system. Division A consisted of the 12 top teams in Europe based on the BSWW European Ranking. Division B consisted of 12 of the lower ranked teams and new entries to the competition. Each division has its own regulations and competition format.

The competition was used as qualifying event for the 2015 European Games. The top three teams from each group in the Superfinal qualified. The top team from the Promotional Finals, excluding the 12th team from Division A, also qualified. Azerbaijan were automatically qualified as hosts.

During the season, FIFA's Amendments to the Beach Soccer Laws of the Game – 2014 came into effect. This involved such changes as only awarding one point for a penalty shootout win (compared to two points previously) and instead of penalty shootouts being sudden death from the outset, both sides will take three penalty kicks each before sudden death rules come into use.

Calendar 

All times are CEST (UTC+02:00).

Teams

Stage 1 (Catania, 20–22 June)

Division A

Group 1

Group 2

Schedule and results

Individual Awards 
MVP:  Noël Ott
Top scorer:  Noël Ott (11 goals)
Best goalkeeper:  Sasha Penke

Stage 2 (Sopot, 27–29 June)

Division A

Group 1

Group 2

Schedule and results

Individual Awards 
MVP:  Witold Ziober
Top scorer:  Llorenç Gómez (7 goals)
Best goalkeeper:  Nuno Hidalgo

Stage 3 (Moscow, 11–13 July)

Division A

Division B

Schedule and results

Individual Awards 
MVP:  Aleksey Makarov
Top scorer:  Ihar Bryshtel,  Aleksey Makarov (4 goals)
Best goalkeeper:  Dona

Stage 4 (Siófok, 8–10 August)

Division A

Division B

Group 1

Group 2

Schedule and results

Individual Awards 
MVP:  Roman Pachev
Top scorer:  Gabriele Gori (9 goals)
Best goalkeeper:  Stefano Spada

Cumulative standings 
The eight best placed teams in Division A (including stage winners and hosts), in which each team played two stages, qualified for the Superfinal. The qualifiers for the Promotion Final were the winners and runners-up in each Division B stage, the best 3rd place team from all of the Division B events, and the last placed team in Division A.

Ranking & tie-breaking criteria: Division A – 1. Points earned 2. Goal difference 3. Goals scored | Division B – 1. Points earned 2. Highest stage placement 3. Goal difference 4. Goals scored.

Division A

Division B

Finals (Torredembarra, 14–17 August) 
The top three teams from each group in the Superfinal qualified for the 2015 European Games in Baku. The top team from the Promotional Final, excluding the 12th team from Division A, also qualified. Azerbaijan was automatically qualified as host country.

Division A (Superfinal)

Group 1 Standings

Group 2 Standings

Group stage results
All kickoff times are of local time in Torredembarra (UTC+02:00).

Play-off results

Seventh-place Match

Fifth-place Match

Third-place Match

Championship final Match

Individual Awards
MVP:  Noël Ott
Top scorer:  Anatoliy Peremitin,  Llorenç Gómez (7 goals)
Best goalkeeper:  Dona

Final Division A Standing

Division B (Promotional Final)

Group 1 Standings

Group 2 Standings

Group stage results
All kickoff times are of local time in Torredembarra (UTC+02:00).

Play-off results

Seventh-place Match

Fifth-place Match

Third-place Match

Promotion Final

Final Division B Standing

1. The Netherlands, a Division A side, did not enter the following year's EBSL in 2015. To ensure 12 teams in the top division in 2015 as normal, BSWW retrospectively awarded promotion to the runners-up of the 2014 Promotion Final as well as the winners, in the lead up to the start of the 2015 season. The runners-up happened to be the relegated side, Poland, who ultimately did not see relegation materialise for this reason and continued to compete in Division A.

Sources 

 Group distribution for EBSL 2014 announced. Beach Soccer Worldwide.

References

External links 

 Beach Soccer Worldwide

Euro Beach Soccer League
2014 in beach soccer
Beach soccer at the 2015 European Games